Desulfobacula is a bacterial genus in the family Desulfobacteraceae.

Species 
The genus contains 2 species (including basonyms and synonyms), namely:
 D. phenolica ( (Bak and Widdel 1988) Kuever et al. 2001, ; New Latin noun phenol -olis, phenol; Latin feminine gender suff. -ica, suffix used with the sense of pertaining to; New Latin feminine gender adjective phenolica, pertaining to phenol.)
 D. toluolica ( Rabus et al. 2000, (Type species of the genus).; New Latin noun toluol (from Fr. or Sp. tolu, balsam from Santiago de Tolu), toluol, toluene; Latin feminine gender suff. -ica, suffix used with the sense of pertaining to; New Latin feminine gender adjective toluolica, pertaining to toluene.)

References

External links 

Desulfobacterales
Bacteria genera